Ragin', Full-On is the first album by American alternative rock band fIREHOSE. It was released after the breakup of the influential punk rock band Minutemen due to the death of the guitarist D. Boon. Like all fIREHOSE albums, Ragin', Full-On is dedicated to Boon.

Production
The band members wrote the songs in various songwriting combinations, some of which included Kira Roessler.

Critical reception
Robert Christgau wrote that "this sound pretty good insofar as it postpunks like the old band and pretty bad insofar as it makes room for Crawford, a moderately hot guitarist whose vocal instincts are as sappy as his lyrics." Trouser Press noted that "first note to last, there’s a prickly, intangible integrity to the band that the restless Boon would have admired." The Rolling Stone Album Guide thought that the album "overcomes its generally spotty writing with impassioned playing."

Track listing 
Adapted from LP labels.

Personnel 
Ed Crawford - guitar, vocals, photography
Mike Watt - bass guitar, vocals, co-producer
George Hurley - drums
Ethan James - producer

References 

1986 debut albums
Firehose (band) albums
Albums produced by Spot (producer)
SST Records albums